Kids 2, Inc., doing business online as Kids2, is an American infant and toddler toy and product manufacturer based in Atlanta, Georgia. The company designs, manufactures and markets Bright Starts, Baby Einstein, and Ingenuity brand products. Kids 2 has international affiliate operation locations in Australia, Canada, Europe, China, Hong Kong, Japan, and  Mexico. In 2013, Kids II had more than 400 products under its brands.

Ryan Gunnigle is the company's CEO.

History
The company was originally named Pansy Ellen Products, and was founded in 1969 primarily as an infant bath and toy manufacturer. In 1992, the company debuted its products in Toys "R" Us stores. The company re-branded in 1993 and changed its name to Kids II, Inc. Kids II began licensing for Disney in 1999.

In 2001, Kids 2 opened its first international office in Hong Kong. The company expanded to Mexico, the United Kingdom, Australia, China, Japan, and Canada by 2006 The company expanded its Hong Kong - based testing lab with the addition of a chemical testing sector in 2009.

The Savannah College of Art and Design (SCAD) partnered with the company in December, 2010. The partnership allowed SCAD students to conceptualize and prototype toy concepts for the company. The firm acquired the Oball and Taggies brands the following year.

In 2012, the company relocated its headquarters from Alpharetta, to Atlanta. The company's new office space and showroom were a finalist in the design category for Atlanta Business Chronicle's 2012 Best in Atlanta Real Estate Awards. The company was also a finalist in the 2011 Georgia Family Business Awards in the large business category. Kids II opened an office in Johannesburg, South Africa in March 2012. The company was one of the first companies in the industry to expand its direct global distribution in South Africa according to Vertical News.

The company received 11 awards at the Graphic Design USA Awards for its package design in 2012. Kids II attended Kind + Jugend, an international juvenile products trade fair in Cologne, Germany. The company showed 350 SKUs at the show. The Atlanta Business Chronicle named Kids II one of the best places to work in Atlanta in 2013.

In October 2013, Kids 2 acquired Baby Einstein, formerly owned by The Walt Disney Company. Baby Einstein products use real world objects, music, art, animals and nature with the intention to introduce infants to the world around them.

In April 2019, Kids 2 announced a recall of 700,000 inclined baby sleepers sold under a variety of different brand names and models.  In August 2019, Kids II announced a name change to Kids2, opening a new factory in China and launching a new direct to consumer website.

In July 2022, Kids 2 acquired a public company, Summer Infant, out of Woonsocket, RI.   Summer Infant is now a wholly owned subsidiary of Kids2 and part of the Kids2 Group.

Operations
In 2018, Kids II was named one of Atlanta's top 50 Private Companies. 

In November 2018, Kids 2 launched Kids2.com, a resource for early stage parents.

Kids II has approximately 750 employees worldwide in 8 offices.

References

1969 establishments in Georgia (U.S. state)
Toy companies established in 1969
Toy companies of the United States
Manufacturing companies based in Atlanta
Infant products companies